Hans-Georg Maaßen (born 24 November 1962) is a German civil servant and lawyer. From 1 August 2012 to 8 November 2018, he served as the President of the Federal Office for the Protection of the Constitution, Germany's domestic security agency and one of three agencies in the German Intelligence Community.

Life and career 
Maaßen was born on 24 November 1962 in Mönchengladbach. In 1991 he began working at Germany's Interior Ministry. On 18 July 2012, Maaßen was appointed by the Cabinet of Germany to take over from Heinz Fromm as President of the Federal Office for the Protection of the Constitution. Several months later, he was sworn in to this post. On 18 September 2018, an agreement was made to promote Maaßen to a role within the Interior Ministry and relieve him of his previous duties once a successor for his post has been agreed on. However, after various statements critical of the German government, he was instead placed in "early retirement" on 8 November 2018.

In April 2021, Maaßen was selected as the Christian Democratic Union's candidate for the constituency of Suhl – Schmalkalden-Meiningen – Hildburghausen – Sonneberg in the 2021 German federal election. He was defeated by Social Democrat Frank Ullrich.

Controversy

2013 mass surveillance disclosures 
During the 2013 mass surveillance disclosures, German media reported that Maaßen visited the headquarters of the U.S. National Security Agency (NSA) in January and May. According to classified documents of the German government, Maaßen had agreed to transfer all data collected by the Federal Office for the Protection of the Constitution via XKeyscore to the NSA.

Snowden question
In June 2016 he questioned whether Edward Snowden was working for Russian intelligence, and Snowden sent a sarcastic response in perfect German. Ob Maaßen Agent des SVR oder FSB ist, kann derzeit nicht belegt werden. (Whether Maaßen is an agent of the SVR or FSB [two Russian security services] cannot be currently determined.)Cooperation with the FSB had also been suggested by Oleg Kalugin, at least since Snowden's arrival in Russia.

Chemnitz protests and retirement
After the 2018 Chemnitz protests, for several weeks politics and the media focused on a video where a black-clad man comes out of an angry mob and briefly runs after another man. Some sources claim that the chased person is of Afghan heritage. 

In response to the video, Maaßen caused controversy as some sources claim that an angry mob had "hunted" foreign-looking people.  In an interview with Bild, Maaßen questioned whether there was any credible evidence for such "hunts", and stated that his security agency had in fact not seen any such evidence. Maaßen offered no reason for questioning the widely accepted narrative of what had happened in Chemnitz.

Maaßen's statements, which seemed to undermine the credibility of the media and political institutions such as the one he represented, led to calls for his dismissal across the political spectrum (excluding the AfD). After Maaßen had been asked to explain his behaviour to a parliamentary committee, the SPD called on Angela Merkel to dismiss Maaßen immediately. This move could have escalated to a crisis within the Fourth Merkel cabinet since the responsible minister, Interior Minister Horst Seehofer, continued to back Maaßen over the row. In attempt to resolve the situation, on 18 September 2018 an agreement was reached to move Maaßen from his role as President of the Federal Office for the Protection of the Constitution to a role as state secretary in Seehofer's ministry. According to media reports this new position would have been on a higher pay grade. However, this proposed solution caused further outrage among the German public and members of the SPD, who did not accept what would effectively be a promotion for Maaßen. A renegotiation within the government ended on 23 September 2018 with an announcement that Maaßen would now be an "advisor" in the interior ministry, and no longer be receiving a pay rise.

Shortly after the Chemnitz controversy, Maaßen caused yet another scandal with his departure speech from the Federal Office for the Protection of the Constitution. According to a copy of this speech leaked to the public in early November 2018, in it Maaßen presented himself as the victim of a conspiracy of "radical left-wing" forces in the German government against him, due to his criticism of the government's "naive", "left-wing" security and migration policies. On 5 November, as a result, Interior Minister Horst Seehofer concluded that a trusting relationship with Maaßen was no longer possible, asking president Frank-Walter Steinmeier to place him in early retirement.

Bundestag candidature 
Maaßen's selection as a CDU candidate for the 2021 federal election was met with controversy both within and outside the party. The Greens and SPD were both critical of the decision, while CDU official Serap Güler and state minister Karin Prien both expressed outrage. Prien described Maaßen as a "marginal actor on the democratic spectrum, with whom most Christian Democrats have little in common." Party secretary Paul Ziemiak stated that the party expects "clear differentation from the AfD" from its candidates. Maaßen stated he sought to win over voters from the Alternative for Germany, as well as protest voters and non-voters. In July 2021, the non-governmental organization Campact announced a campaign to prevent Maaßen from being elected. Maaßen was defeated in the direct mandate election for the Thuringian constituency of Suhl – Schmalkalden-Meiningen – Hildburghausen – Sonneberg by Social Democrat Frank Ullrich. As he was not on the CDU party list in Thuringia, he thus failed to be elected to the Bundestag.

References 

1962 births
Living people
21st-century German civil servants
People from Mönchengladbach
German Christian democrats
University of Cologne alumni